This Is How It Feels is the sixth album by The Golden Palominos, released on September 28, 1993, by Restless Records. It was the first of two Golden Palominos records to feature vocals by Lori Carson, who also appears on the album's cover.

Track listing

Personnel 
Musicians
Lori Carson – vocals
Bootsy Collins – guitar
Anton Fier – drums, percussion, programming, production, art direction
Bill Laswell – bass guitar
Nicky Skopelitis – guitar
Bernie Worrell – Hammond organ
Jeff Bova – keyboards, additional programming
Amanda Kramer – keyboards
Lydia Kavanagh – vocals on "To a Stranger", "These Days" and "A Divine Kiss"

Production and additional personnel
Melanie Acevedo – photography
Bruce Calder – mixing, recording
Oz Fritz – recording
Dean Karr – photography
Matt Stein – programming, mixing, recording
Howie Weinberg – mastering

References

External links 
 

1993 albums
The Golden Palominos albums
Restless Records albums
Albums produced by Anton Fier